Ioan Alexandru Pop (born 29 August 1945 in Bucharest) is a former Romanian rugby union player. Played flanker and number eight. He was captain of the Romanian Rugby team in 1974 and 1975,
a period when Romania's National Rugby Team gained respect in both hemispheres of the rugby world. Alexandru led a highly motivated and talented Romanian Rugby Team to wins against France 15–10 in Bucharest, the FIRA – Association of European Rugby championship, and obtained a 10–10 draw against the New Zealand Junior All Blacks in Wellington.

Alexandru Pop played rugby from 1963 to 1979. Between 1970 and 1975, he played for Romania 36 times, 19 of which were Test Matches. In 1976, Alexandru retired from playing international rugby. He took the time to focus on his engineering career, play rugby for his own club, and coach the under-19 teams for both his club and his country.

While the August-1975 draw against the Junior All Blacks in Wellington was a surprise to the rugby world, the New Zealand experts surmised that, "The Romanians would probably have won had they trusted their running rather than their kicking.

In 1975 Alexandru Pop was awarded the Honored Master of Sport  title by the Romanian Rugby Federation.

Sponsored by former United States Eagles and Philadelphia Whitemarsh Rugby Football Club coach George Betzler, Alexandru immigrated with his family to United States in December 1982. Since 1983, he and his family have lived in Southern California.

Alexandru Pop's rugby career was covered in several Romanian rugby books such as The 15 in the Carpathians and Rugby – Small Encyclopedia.
Pop and his son Max visited the Romanian Rugby delegation to the 2011 Rugby World Cup, in New Zealand.

See also
 List of Romania national rugby union players

References

External links
 

1945 births
Living people
Romanian rugby union players
Romania international rugby union players
Rugby union flankers
Rugby union number eights
Rugby union players from Bucharest
Romanian emigrants to the United States